West Coast Number Theory (WCNT), a meeting that has also been known variously as the Western Number Theory Conference and the Asilomar Number Theory meeting, is an annual gathering of number theorists first organized by D. H. and Emma Lehmer at the Asilomar Conference Grounds in 1969. In his tribute to D. H. Lehmer, John Brillhart stated that "There is little doubt that one of [Dick and Emma's] most enduring contributions to the world of mathematicians is their founding of the West Coast Number Theory Meeting [an annual event] in 1969". To date, the conference remains an active meeting of young and experienced number theorists alike.

History
West Coast Number Theory has been held at a variety of locations throughout western North America. Typically, odd years are held in Pacific Grove, California. Until 2013, this was always at the Asilomar Conference Grounds, though meetings from 2014-2017 moved to the Lighthouse Lodge, just up the road.

1969 Asilomar
1970 Tucson
1971 Asilomar
1972 Claremont
1973 Los Angeles
1974 Los Angeles
1975 Asilomar
1976 San Diego
1977 Los Angeles
1978 Santa Barbara
1979 Asilomar
1980 Tucson
1981 Santa Barbara
1982 San Diego
1983 Asilomar
1984 Asilomar
1985 Asilomar
1986 Tucson
1987 Asilomar
1988 Las Vegas
1989 Asilomar
1990 Asilomar
1991 Asilomar
1992 Corvallis
1993 Asilomar
1994 San Diego
1995 Asilomar
1996 Las Vegas
1997 Asilomar
1998 San Francisco
1999 Asilomar
2000 San Diego
2001 Asilomar
2002 San Francisco
2003 Asilomar
2004 Las Vegas
2005 Asilomar
2006 Ensenada
2007 Asilomar
2008 Fort Collins
2009 Asilomar
2010 Orem
2011 Asilomar
2012 Asilomar
2013 Asilomar
 2014 Pacific Grove
 2015 Pacific Grove
 2016 Pacific Grove
 2017 Pacific Grove
 2018 Chico
 2019 Asilomar (50th Anniversary Conference)
 2020 Canceled
 2021 Virtual
 2022 Asilomar

Related

 Asilomar Conference Grounds
 Pacific Grove, California

References

External links
 West Coast Number Theory page

Mathematics conferences
History of Monterey County, California
History of the Monterey Bay Area
Events in the Monterey Bay Area